Greek-Polish relations are relations between Greece and Poland. Both countries are full members of NATO, the European Union, OECD, OSCE, the Council of Europe and the World Trade Organization. There are circa 4,000 people of Greek descent living in Poland, and over 20,000 people of Polish descent living in Greece.
Greece has given full support to Poland's membership in the European Union and NATO.

History
Since antiquity there have been direct and indirect contact between Greece and Poland. Historic Greek cities in present-day Ukraine had contacts with the people of Poland. During the Middle Ages Polish authors, politicians and philosophers were influenced by Greek literature, democracy and sense of freedom. Greeks, many of whom were merchants, lived in Poland since the Late Middle Ages (see Greeks in Poland).

Since the 19th century both nations often shared a similar fate, and their history has sometimes intertwined. In the 19th century both were under the rule of foreign powers. Greece was ruled by the Ottoman Empire, and Poland was partitioned between Austria, Prussia (afterwards Germany) and Russia. Greece eventually regained independence during the Greek War of Independence in the 1820s, in which Polish volunteers also fought on the side of the Greeks, including the Battle of Peta and the defense of Missolonghi. Several Polish 19th-century uprisings remained unsuccessful, and Poland regained independence only after World War I in 1918. In 1919 both countries officially established diplomatic relations. Both nations exchanged ambassadors in 1922. In 1937–1939, both ethnic Poles and Greeks in the Soviet Union were subjected to genocidal campaigns carried out by the NKVD, known as the Polish Operation and the Greek Operation respectively.

During the German-Soviet invasion of Poland, which started World War II in 1939, Greece declared neutrality. Despite this, some of the escape routes of Poles who fled from occupied Poland to Hungary and Romania led through Greece. The Poles were then transported from Greek ports, aboard Polish, Greek and other ships, to Polish-allied France, where the Polish Army was reconstituted to continue the fight against Germany. Eventually, Greece, fearing Germany, refused to further allow Poles to evacuate aboard Greek ships, and difficulties arose, causing the escape route to be diverted to Bulgaria. By 1941 there were between 100 and 194 Polish refugees, among them Polish Jews, in Greece. In 1940–1941 the Polish Embassy in Athens and the Polish government-in-exile tried to evacuate the refugees from Greece, including Polish Jews to British Palestine, but Polish- and Greek-allied Britain did not agree. Greece was eventually invaded as well, by Germany and Italy in 1941, and the Polish Embassy was closed. Jerzy Iwanow-Szajnowicz, a native of Poland who worked for Polish and British intelligence in occupied Greece, became a hero of the Greek resistance, commemorated with a monument in Thessaloniki.

In 1946, Greece entered into a civil war which saw over 14,000 Greeks migrate and find refuge in Poland after the communists in Greece were defeated in 1949. The Greeks settled predominantly in the Polish cities and towns of Zgorzelec, Wrocław, Bielawa, Bielsko-Biała, Dzierżoniów, Gdynia, Jelenia Góra, Katowice, Kraków (in the Nowa Huta district), Legnica, Lubań, Niemcza, Szczecin, Świdnica, Wałbrzych and Warsaw.

In 1981, Greece joined the European Union. Poland joined the union in 2004. Since Polish ascension into the union, over 20,000 Poles have migrated to Greece for employment, however, since the Greek government-debt crisis beginning in 2009, many Poles have returned and many Greeks have migrated to Poland in search of employment.

A Polish military contingent participated in a NATO mission to assist Greece in ensuring security during the 2004 Summer Olympics.

In February 2021, the Sejm (Polish parliament) adopted by acclamation a resolution commemorating the 200th anniversary of the Greek War of Independence, after which Greece regained its sovereignty.

In August 2021, Poland sent a group of 143 firefighters and 46 vehicles to Greece to help extinguish the 2021 Greece wildfires. During the operation, Polish firefighters saved the town of Vilia from the fire.

High-level visits

High-level visits from Greece to Poland

 Prime Minister Kostas Simitis (2003)
 President Karolos Papoulias (2013)

High-level visits from Poland to Greece

 President Aleksander Kwaśniewski (2003)
 Prime Minister Leszek Miller (2003)
 Prime Minister Donald Tusk (2009)
 President Andrzej Duda (2017)

Bilateral Treaties

 Memorandum of Mutual Understanding on Cooperation in the Defence Industry (Warsaw, 29 June 2004);
 Agreement on economic, scientific, and technical cooperation in Agriculture and Food Economics (Athens, 7 September 1995);
 Agreement on Cooperation in Science and Technology (Warsaw, 9 November 1998);
 Agreement on the avoidance of double taxation (28 May 1987).

Transportation
There are direct flights between Greece and Poland with the following airlines: Aegean Airlines, Ryanair, LOT Polish Airlines, Small Planet Airlines, SmartWings and Wizz Air.

Resident diplomatic missions
 Greece has an embassy in Warsaw.
 Poland has an embassy in Athens.

See also
 Poles in Greece
 Greeks in Poland
 Poland in the European Union

Notes

 
Poland
Greece